Mark Carlon (born 18 October 1953) is a former Australian rules footballer who played with St. Kilda in the Victorian Football League (VFL).

Notes

External links 

Living people
1953 births
Australian rules footballers from Western Australia
St Kilda Football Club players
Claremont Football Club players